Don't Stop the Carnival is a 1965 novel by American writer Herman Wouk. It is a comedy about escaping middle-age crisis to the Caribbean, a heaven that quickly turns into a hell for the main character. The novel was turned into a short-lived musical and later, album by Jimmy Buffett in 1997.

Plot
Don't Stop the Carnival revolves around the lead character of Norman Paperman. He is the middle-aged New York City press agent who leaves the noise and safety of the big city and runs away to a (fictional) Caribbean island to redeem and reinvent himself as a hotel keeper. The result is a satirical tale of tropical disaster.

The novel takes place on the fictional island of Amerigo. According to the opening of the musical (a paraphrased excerpt from the novel):

Background

This book is based on Herman Wouk's experiences in the Virgin Islands in the early 1960 in Saint Thomas, U.S. Virgin Islands. The story centers around the fictional experiences of a New York advertising executive, not on Herman Wouk himself. The hotel referred to in the book was the Royal Mail Inn on Hassel Island, located in Charlotte Amalie Harbour. In this novel, Wouk relates stories of happenings, some perhaps fictional and actual, that he observed while living on St. Thomas, where the carnival never stops.

Adaptations
The novel was turned into a short-lived musical and later, album by Jimmy Buffett in 1997. Buffett refers to the development of the musical in his memoir of an aeronautical circumnavigation of the Caribbean shortly after his fiftieth birthday, A Pirate Looks at Fifty.

References

1965 American novels
Novels by Herman Wouk
Novels set in the Caribbean
Doubleday (publisher) books
Novels set in hotels